Tabira is a city in the state of Pernambuco, Brazil. The population in 2020, according to the Brazilian Institute of Geography and Statistics, was 28,704 inhabitants. Its land area is 388 km2.

Geography 

 State - Pernambuco
 Region - Sertão Pernambucano
 Boundaries - Santa Terezinha and Paraiba state (N); Ingazeira and Iguaraci (S); Santa Terezinha and São José do Egito (E); Afogados da Ingazeira and Solidão (W).
 Area - 388 km2
 Elevation - 558 m
 Hydrography - Pajeú River
 Vegetation - Caatinga hiperxerófila
 Climate - semi-arid hot and tropical hot
 Annual average temperature - 27.0 c
 Distance to Recife - 398 km

Economy 

The main economic activities in Tabira are based in the food and beverage industry, commerce and agribusiness, especially the raising of cattle, sheep, pigs, goats; and plantations of corn and beans.

Economic indicators 

Economy by sector
2006

Health indicators

References 

Municipalities in Pernambuco